Bregant is the family name of following persons:

 Camillo Bregant (1879–1956), Austrian Major General
 Ernst Bregant * 1920, Austrian Navy Officer in Nazi Germany, Lawyer and Tennis Player 
 Eugen Bregant (1875-1936), Austrian Major General and Colonel
 Katalin Bregant (1893–1991), also Kathalin Bregant-Fautz, born Edle von Fautz, Austrian Red Cross Representative

Disambiguation pages with surname-holder lists